Rhys Evans (born 1992) is a former professional rugby league footballer who played as a  or  mostly recently for the Bradford Bulls in the Betfred Championship. He has played for both the England Knights and Wales at international level.

He has previously played for the Warrington Wolves in the Super League, and on loan from Warrington at the Leigh Centurions, Swinton Lions and the North Wales Crusaders. He has also played for Leigh in the Championship, and also on loan from Bradford at the Leeds Rhinos in the Super League.

Background
Evans was born in Bridgend, Wales.

He is the twin brother of fellow Wales international Ben Evans.

Early career
Both he and his brother were noticed by scouts of numerous Super League clubs while representing their secondary school, Brynteg Comprehensive School, in the National Schools Rugby League final on two separate occasions, 2004 and 2005.

Although he had been brought up in an area dominated by rugby union, and playing junior rugby for Tondu RFC, he and his brother accepted a scholarship with Warrington and moved there as teenagers.

Known for his tremendous footwork, agility and speed, he is thought to have a bright future in the game.

Domestic career
Evans made his Warrington début in 2010.

However, his game time was restricted in 2015 through multiple injuries.

In 2016, Evans has begun the season playing right-, scoring 2 tries against the Catalans Dragons in a 30–20 win.

He played in the 2016 Challenge Cup Final defeat by Hull F.C. at Wembley Stadium.

He played in the 2016 Super League Grand Final defeat by the Wigan Warriors at Old Trafford.

In June 2017 Evans signed a three-year deal to join Leigh from the start of the 2018 season.

On 30 September 2020 it was announced that Evans would return to Bradford for the 2021 season, after the 2020 Leeds loan deal ended

International career
Having represented Wales at youth level, Evans made his Wales début in their opening match of the 2013 Rugby League World Cup.

He was selected in the Wales 9s squad for the 2019 Rugby League World Cup 9s.

References

External links

Leigh Centurions profile

Wales profile
Welsh profile

1992 births
Living people
Bradford Bulls players
England Knights national rugby league team players
Leeds Rhinos players
Leigh Leopards players
North Wales Crusaders players
Rugby league centres
Rugby league players from Bridgend
Rugby league wingers
Swinton Lions players
Wales national rugby league team players
Warrington Wolves players
Welsh rugby league players
Welsh rugby union players